Joseph Bologna (December 30, 1934 – August 13, 2017) was an American actor, playwright and screenwriter notable for his roles in the comedy films My Favorite Year, Blame It on Rio, and Transylvania 6-5000.

Life and career
Bologna was born in the Parkville section of Brooklyn, New York to an Italian-American family.  He attended St. Rose of Lima school and Brown University, where he majored in art history. Bologna served with the United States Marine Corps. Bologna was hired to produce and direct Manhattan-based TV commercials.

Bologna enjoyed a long run in film and television. His breakthrough film Lovers and Other Strangers adapted with his wife Renée Taylor from a play they co-wrote, was based on the true-life circumstances of organizing a wedding on short notice with the involvement of his Italian extended family and her Jewish clan. Several relatives performed as extras in the final cut. The couple shared an Academy Award nomination for Best Adapted Screenplay. A year later, in 1971, the couple again collaborated to write and perform in the movie Made for Each Other.

Bologna stayed close with his old-neighborhood aunts and uncles after becoming successful. Two of them were slightly famous on their own: His Uncle Pat was Blacky the Bootblack, whom Joseph Kennedy credited as his main influence when he sold all of his stock holdings in the summer of 1929 (the market crashed in October); his aunt Pauline was one of the better-known celebrity chefs, working for Jackie Gleason, Burt Reynolds and others.

Bologna's aunt Pauline chastised him for starring in Blame It on Rio (starring Michael Caine), which contained some nudity; Bologna remarked "Blame it on me. It's the last time I invite Aunt Pauline to a film premiere." In 1976, he starred in the television drama What Now, Catherine Curtis? with Lucille Ball. Other film roles for Bologna include: 
 playing the brother of James Caan's widowed protagonist in Neil Simon's 1979 romance Chapter Two
 portraying the Sid Caesar-based character King Kaiser in the 1982 comedy hit My Favorite Year (which starred Peter O'Toole in the role of drunken movie star Alan Swann, who was modeled after Errol Flynn)
 as Lenny Koufax, the frustrated father of perpetual slacker Sonny Koufax (Adam Sandler) in the 1999 comedy Big Daddy

In 1987, Bologna starred in the TV musical sitcom Rags to Riches as Nick Foley, a millionaire mogul turned adoptive father.

He played the mad scientist Dr. Malavaqua in the 1985 comedy Transylvania 6-5000.

From 1996 to 1998, he was the voice of the character Inspector Dan Turpin, a hot-headed police officer modeled after Jack Kirby, in several episodes of Superman: The Animated Series.

In 2006, he became the voice of Mr. Start in Ice Age: The Meltdown.

He and his wife Renée Taylor had a son Gabriel. Gabriel became an actor, writer and director, and directed his father in his last film, "Tango Shalom". Taylor and Bologna starred together on stage and on television. Bologna played a love interest for his wife in the episode "Maternal Affairs" of the sitcom The Nanny in the sixth and final season, in which Taylor plays Sylvia, the mother of Fran Drescher's character. He also appeared in the first-season episode "The Gym Teacher" as a famous actor for whom Maxwell Sheffield once interned.

From 2012 until before his death in 2017, Bologna appeared in numerous roles on TV and in motion pictures, including roles on Funny or Die, stage productions, and national commercials.

In 2017, Bologna received the Night of 100 Stars Oscar Gala Lifetime Achievement Award from actor comedian Richard Lewis and his peers to celebrate his 60-year career and to recognize his efforts to save the Motion Picture Home and Hospital in 2012.

Death
Bologna died on August 13, 2017, at City of Hope National Medical Center in Duarte, California from pancreatic cancer at age 82.

Filmography

Film

Television

Notes

References

External links
 
 
 
 

1934 births
2017 deaths
20th-century American male actors
21st-century American male actors
American male film actors
American male screenwriters
American male stage actors
American male television actors
American writers of Italian descent
Brown University alumni
Deaths from cancer in California
Deaths from pancreatic cancer
Emmy Award winners
Male actors from New York City
People from Brooklyn
United States Marines
Screenwriters from New York (state)